Masayuki Ito (born January 19, 1991) is a retired Japanese professional boxer who held the  WBO super-featherweight title from 2018 to 2019.

Professional career

Ito vs. Diaz 
Ito turned professional in 2009 and amassed a record of 23-1-1 in 25 fights before challenging and beating Puerto Rican boxer Christopher Diaz for the vacant WBO junior lightweight title.

Ito vs. Herring 
On 25 May, 2019, Ito fought Jamel Herring for the WBO super featherweight title. The scorecards were announced as 110-118, 112-116, 110-118 in favor of the winner Jamel Herring.

Ito vs. Yoshino 
On 9 April, 2022, Ito fought Shuichiro Yoshino. Yoshino, who was ranked#5 by the WBO, #13 by the IBF and #15 by the WBC at lightweight beat Ito by technical decision in their 11 round contest.

Professional boxing record

Retirement and promotions career
Ito retired after his bout with Shuichiro Yoshino. He started promoting boxers thereafter.

See also
List of super-featherweight boxing champions
List of Japanese boxing world champions

References

External links

Masayuki Ito - Profile, News Archive & Current Rankings at Box.Live

1991 births
Living people
Sportspeople from Tokyo
Komazawa University alumni
Japanese male boxers
Super-featherweight boxers
Lightweight boxers
World super-featherweight boxing champions
World Boxing Organization champions